Novellas are works of prose fiction longer than a short story but shorter than a novel.  Several novellas have been recognized as among the best examples of the literary form. Publishers and literary award societies typically consider a novella's word count to be between 17,000 and 40,000 words.

Major novellas 

Certain novellas have been recognized as the best examples of the literary form, through their appearance on multiple best-of lists.

Other notable novellas

Additionally, several novellas have been included on at least one best-of list.

References 

Literature lists